Gary George Pettis (born April 3, 1958) is an American former professional baseball center fielder in Major League Baseball (MLB) and current third base coach for the Houston Astros.  During his playing career, Pettis won five Gold Glove Awards and finished in the top ten in stolen bases in the American League seven times.

Biography
Pettis was selected in the 6th round of the 1979 draft by the California Angels, and played minor league baseball for the Salinas Spurs of the class "A" California League in 1980, then the Holyoke Millers of the double "A" Eastern League in 1981. In 1982, Pettis was promoted to the California Angels, where he played the first six seasons of his career.

After the 1987 season, Pettis went on to play two seasons with the Detroit Tigers, 1988 through the following season of 1989. After two years with Detroit, Pettis joined the Texas Rangers for two seasons, 1990–91. Pettis finished his career in the major leagues in 1992. The 1992 season saw Pettis play for two teams. After leaving the Texas Rangers, Pettis joined the San Diego Padres for the 1992 season but ended that season back in Detroit with the Tigers.

During his career, Pettis consistently hit for low averages and was known for striking out often, but he performed extremely well on defense, earning five Gold Glove Awards. He was noted for making many spectacular leaping or diving catches, depriving hitters of home runs or base hits, and was known in baseball circles as "The man who made center field look easy". Additionally, he was a prolific base runner and had five seasons where he stole over 40 bases. Pettis held the Angels' club record for stolen bases for nearly 20 years, until it was broken by Chone Figgins on July 15, 2007. Pettis was tagged as "Pac Man" Pettis by a local radio station listener call-in contest in 1986, referring to his unusual speed in the outfield and ability to chase down opponents' hits.

On his 1985 Topps baseball card, the person posing in the picture is not Pettis; it is in fact a picture of his younger brother.

In 2022, the Astros won 106 games, the second-highest total in franchise history.  They advanced to the World Series and defeated the Philadelphia Phillies in six games to give Pettis his second World Series title as an Astro.

Personal life
His nephew, Austin Pettis, is a former wide receiver for the St. Louis Rams and San Diego Chargers.
Pettis has four children, Paige, Kyler, Shaye, and Dante. Dante plays wide receiver for the Chicago Bears and set the NCAA record for most career punt return touchdowns while at the University of Washington. Kyler is an actor who appeared on the NBC daytime drama Days of Our Lives.
Brother Stacey Pettis was drafted #94 4th round 1981 by Pittsburgh Pirates. Played in the Pirates system (1981-1984) and Angels (1985-1986). Stacey has been scouting for the past 20 yrs. Seattle Mariners (2001-2016), St Louis Cardinals (2018–present).

See also
 List of Major League Baseball career stolen bases leaders

References

External links

Venezuelan Professional Baseball League bio

1958 births
Living people
African-American baseball coaches
African-American baseball players
American expatriate baseball players in Canada
Baseball coaches from California
Baseball players from Oakland, California
California Angels players
Chicago White Sox coaches
Detroit Tigers players
Edmonton Trappers players
Gold Glove Award winners
Holyoke Millers players
Houston Astros coaches
Idaho Falls Angels players
Leones del Caracas players
American expatriate baseball players in Venezuela
Major League Baseball center fielders
Major League Baseball first base coaches
New York Mets coaches
Salinas Angels players
San Diego Padres players
Spokane Indians players
Tacoma Tigers players
Texas Rangers coaches
Texas Rangers players
Tiburones de La Guaira players
Toledo Mud Hens players
21st-century African-American people
20th-century African-American sportspeople